John H. Ascroft (born 1909) was an English professional footballer who played as an outside left. He made appearance in the English Football League for Wrexham. He also was on the books of EFL clubs Oldham Athletic and Arsenal but never made an appearance for either club.

Reviews
The Football Gazette (South Shields) said:
Wrexham are not going to miss Gunson, their goalgetting left winger, so very much if John Herbert Ascroft repeats the delightful form he displayed against Stockport County a week ago, for apart from scoring this youngster was a real live wire in all he did. He played with the Bangor City club last season and there attracted quite a lot of attention, but did not wish to go far from North Wales. Wrexham have quite a good opinion of him.

References

1909 births
Year of death missing
English footballers
Association football forwards
English Football League players
Connah's Quay & Shotton F.C. players
Flint Town United F.C. players
Oldham Athletic A.F.C. players
Arsenal F.C. players
Bangor City F.C. players
Wrexham A.F.C. players
Workington A.F.C. players
Runcorn F.C. Halton players